Qiu Chen (邱晨, Pinyin: Qiū Chén; born 1 June 1963) is a Chinese former basketball player who competed in the 1984 Summer Olympics.

In 1986, she moved to Australia after meeting Jenny Cheesman and played for the Canberra Capitals in 1988, under the name "Qui Chen." She had chosen to move to Australia because of her desire to learn the English language.

References

1963 births
Living people
Chinese women's basketball players
Expatriate basketball people in Australia
Basketball players from Shanxi
Basketball players at the 1984 Summer Olympics
Medalists at the 1984 Summer Olympics
Olympic basketball players of China
Olympic bronze medalists for China
Olympic medalists in basketball
Basketball players at the 1982 Asian Games
Basketball players at the 1986 Asian Games
Asian Games medalists in basketball
Canberra Capitals players
Asian Games gold medalists for China
Medalists at the 1982 Asian Games
Medalists at the 1986 Asian Games
20th-century Chinese women